Springville High School may refer to:

Springville High School (Alabama), Springville, Alabama
Springville High School (Iowa), Springville, Iowa
Springville High School (New York), Springville
Springville High School (Utah), Springville